The Malawi FAM Charity Shield is an association football competition held in Malawi. It was founded in 2016 and replaced the Malawi Charity Shield as well as the Tutulane Charity Cup. It is a single match held between the Malawi FAM Cup winners and the Malawi Premier Division league champions, with money raised going to a charity in Malawi. It is overseen by the Malawi Football Association and is held annually in March or April, but did not take place in 2020 or 2021 due to the COVID-19 pandemic.

Nyasa Big Bullets FC are the only winners and current holders of the FAM Charity Shield.

Winners

References 

Football competitions in Malawi
Recurring sporting events established in 2016
2016 establishments in Malawi